The long-tailed bush warbler (Locustella caudata) is a species of grass warbler (family Locustellidae). It was formerly included in the "Old World warbler" assemblage.

It is found only in the Philippines.

References

 BirdLife International 2004.  Bradypterus caudatus.   2006 IUCN Red List of Threatened Species.   Downloaded on 10 July 2007.

long-tailed bush warbler
Endemic birds of the Philippines
Birds of Luzon
Birds of Mindanao
long-tailed bush warbler
Taxonomy articles created by Polbot